Wang Wenquan (born December 1962) is a lieutenant general in the People's Liberation Army of China.

He is a delegate to the 13th National People's Congress. He is a representative of the 20th National Congress of the Chinese Communist Party and a member of the 20th Central Committee of the Chinese Communist Party.

Biography
Wang was born in Xinzhou County, Hubei, in December 1962.

He served in the 20th Group Army for a long time. He was Director of the Political Department of the 26th Group Army (now 80th Group Army) in July 2013 and subsequently political commissar of the 27th Group Army in March 2016. One year later, he became political commissar of the 72nd Group Army.

He was promoted to the rank of major general (shaojiang) in July 2014 and lieutenant general (zhongjiang) in June 2020.

References

1962 births
Living people
People from Wuhan
People's Liberation Army generals from Hubei
People's Republic of China politicians from Hubei
Chinese Communist Party politicians from Hubei
Members of the 20th Central Committee of the Chinese Communist Party
Delegates to the 13th National People's Congress